Ernst Späth (14 May 1886 in Moravský Beroun – 30 September 1946 in Zurich) was an Austrian chemist, specializing in natural products.

Life
Späth was the first to synthesise mescaline and was one of the first to synthesize cuscohygrine on a small scale with Hans Tuppy.

He lost everything in World War II, and died with no money. His former student Percy Lavon Julian returned to Vienna, paid for his funeral, and commissioned a bust of Späth, which is still displayed in the foyer of the Faculty of Chemistry of the University of Vienna. A second cast of the bust was erected in 1961 in the Arkadenhof of the University of Vienna.

References

Biography

Publications
 

Austrian chemists
1886 births
1946 deaths
Moravian-German people
Austrian people of Moravian-German descent
Austrian expatriates in Switzerland
People from Moravský Beroun
20th-century Austrian scientists
20th-century chemists